Trente Oiseaux is a record label founded by experimental musician Bernhard Günter in 1995.

Early releases featured musicians such as Francisco López, Roel Meelkop, John Duncan, Jim O'Rourke, Daniel Menche and Günter himself.

A bout of ill health forced Günter to slow down operations in the late 1990s, however the label made a comeback in 1999 and has continued to be a prolific label in the field of minimalist music.

See also
 List of record labels

External links
https://trenteoiseaux.de/
https://trenteoiseaux.bandcamp.com/ Trente Oiseaux Bandcamp
http://trenteoiseaux.blogspot.com/ Bernhard Günter's blog with some freely downloadable Trente Oiseaux records in Flac format.
www.simonwhetham.co.uk

German record labels
Record labels established in 1995
Experimental music record labels